Aubermesnil-aux-Érables is a commune in the Seine-Maritime department in the Normandy region in northern France.

Geography
It is surrounded by the lower Eu Forest and is the source of the river Yères.

Population

Places of interest
 The church dating from the eleventh century.
 The chapel, rebuilt in the 18th century.
 The forest of Eu.

Notable people
The French actor Bourvil bought a farm here and spent much time in the village.

See also
Communes of the Seine-Maritime department

References

Communes of Seine-Maritime